Morgan Rhys (1716–1779) was a Welsh hymn-writer.

Morgan Rhys may also refer to:
 Morgan John Rhys (1760–1804) Welsh Baptist minister
 Morgan ap Rhys ap Philip (16th century), Welsh politician

See also

 Rhys Morgan (disambiguation)